The 2001 EA Sports 500 was a NASCAR Winston Cup Series race that took place on October 21, 2001, at Talladega Superspeedway in Talladega, Alabama. It was the 31st race of the 2001 NASCAR Winston Cup Series.

Race report 
The race is known for its wild finish. Coming out of the tri-oval to the white flag, Dale Earnhardt Jr. attempted to pull to the inside of race leader Bobby Labonte. Instead of going with his Joe Gibbs Racing teammate, Tony Stewart moved down and got behind Dale Jr. and Earnhardt took the lead in turn 1. Bobby Hamilton got a run after a push from Ricky Craven and attempted to pass Labonte but Labonte blocked Hamilton. Out of turn 2, Labonte got hooked by Hamilton in the left rear causing Labonte to spin into Ricky Craven collecting Johnny Benson shooting Labonte back to the right and Labonte went upside down. This would cause the big one on the backstretch collecting as many as 15 cars. In the race back to the line, Dale Earnhardt Jr. would hold off Tony Stewart and Jeff Burton to win the race. This race would be Dale Earnhardt Jr's first of six career wins at Talladega including 4 in a row from this race to the 2003 Aaron's 499.

Results

References

EA Sports 500
EA Sports 500
NASCAR races at Talladega Superspeedway